Elerson G. Smith (born July 17, 1998) is an American football linebacker for the New York Giants of the National Football League (NFL). He played college football at Northern Iowa and was drafted by the Giants in the fourth round of the 2021 NFL Draft.

Early life and high school
Smith was born and grew up in Minneapolis, Minnesota and attended Minneapolis South High School. He also lettered in track and field, wrestling and basketball.

College career
Smith redshirted his true freshman season and did not play in any games as a redshirt freshman. He started seeing playing time as a redshirt sophomore and finished the season with 19 tackles, 10.5 tackles for loss, 7.5 sacks, and a forced fumble. Smith was named first-team All-Missouri Valley Football Conference and a first-team FCS All-American by the AFCA after recording 63 total tackles, 14 sacks, 21.5 tackles for loss and five forced fumbles. Smith was named the Preseason Defensive Player of the Year before announcing that he would forgo his redshirt senior season, which was to be played in the spring due to Covid-19, and prepare for the 2021 NFL Draft. Smith played in the 2021 Senior Bowl.

Professional career

Smith was selected in the fourth round with the 116th overall pick of the 2021 NFL Draft by the New York Giants. Smith signed his four-year rookie contract with the Giants on May 25, 2021. He was placed on injured reserve on September 1, 2021 to start the season. On November 6, 2021, Smith was activated from injured reserve. On January 5, 2022, Smith was placed on injured reserve with a neck injury.

On August 31, 2022, Smith was placed on injured reserve. He was activated from injured reserve on October 29. He was placed back on injured reserve on December 16.

References

External links
Northern Iowa Panthers bio
New York Giants bio

Living people
Players of American football from Minneapolis
American football defensive ends
Northern Iowa Panthers football players
South High School (Minnesota) alumni
New York Giants players
1998 births